Timothy Kane Sheehy (born September 3, 1948) is a Canadian born American ice hockey player. Sheehy played Minnesota high school hockey for International Falls before joining the Boston College men's ice hockey team. Sheehy, who has dual citizenship, also played for the American national team 1969 and 1971 World Championships as well as the 1972 Winter Olympic Games, where he won a silver medal.

Playing career
Sheehy was signed by the World Hockey Association's New England Whalers after the Olympics and later also played 433 games for the WHA Edmonton Oilers and Birmingham Bulls before moving on to the National Hockey League where he played a total of 27 games for the Detroit Red Wings and Hartford Whalers before retiring from professional hockey in 1980.

Sheehy was inducted into the United States Hockey Hall of Fame in 1997. Sheehy is the nephew of legendary National Football League player Bronko Nagurski. His younger brother Neil Sheehy also played in the NHL.

Career statistics

Regular season and playoffs

International

See also
 List of members of the United States Hockey Hall of Fame

Awards and honors

References

External links
 

1948 births
Living people
American men's ice hockey right wingers
American sportspeople of Canadian descent
Birmingham Bulls players
Boston College Eagles men's ice hockey players
Canadian ice hockey right wingers
Cincinnati Stingers (CHL) players
Detroit Red Wings players
Edmonton Oilers (WHA) players
Hartford Whalers players
Ice hockey players from Minnesota
Ice hockey people from Ontario
Ice hockey players at the 1972 Winter Olympics
Kansas City Red Wings players
Medalists at the 1972 Winter Olympics
New England Whalers players
Olympic silver medalists for the United States in ice hockey
Sportspeople from Fort Frances
People from International Falls, Minnesota
United States Hockey Hall of Fame inductees
AHCA Division I men's ice hockey All-Americans